Brønshøj BK, full name Brønshøj Boldklub, is a Danish football club located in the outskirts of Copenhagen. The club was founded 15 May. 1919.

History in brief
Early years:

Brønshøj BK's first decades was spent in local leagues in the Copenhagen area, and also saw mergers with other local teams, although always retaining the name Brønshøj Boldklub.

Entering the national league system:
 
Brønshøj Boldklub had their first appearance in Danmarksturneringen (the national league system) in the season of 1944–45 after winning a qualification group, and the team has continuously since then been a part of the Danmarksturneringen.
The next decade was spent yo-yoing between the two lower tiers, the team almost getting demoted out of the league system in the season of 1952–53. They were saved only by a marginally better goal difference than Hvidovre IF.

Entering the highest tier:

The late 1950s saw the team make a positive turn around, first winning the 3rd tier in 1955–56, and then winning the 2nd tier in 1961, thereby entering the 1st tier (1. division) for the first time ever in 1962. Relegation followed in 1964.
The team stuck in 2. division for a handful of seasons being runners up in 1969, and thus getting promoted to 1.division yet again. The stay in the highest league lasted three seasons.

This part of the century in a way marked the best days of Brønshøj BK. The team did not make top the top of the 1st tier, but they were relatively competitive in the league due to the strict code of amateurism that Danish football was under at the time. The team also managed to make it to the semifinals of the Danish Cup three times, and additionally about a dozen players appeared on the national team.

The peak:

The team was again yo-yoing between the two lower tiers for several seasons, before two consecutive promotions again saw them a place in the 1st tier (1.division) in 1983.

Brønshøj BK reached its peak in the season of 1984 under the guidance of manager Ebbe Skovdahl, when the team finished in 5th place in 1. division, the club's all-time highest. 
The club was relegated from the 1. division in 1989, and has not since then been represented in the highest tier.
 
The explanation for this last fact could be that in the meantime, the national league system had undergone a dramatic change, with the introduction of professional football in 1978. 
Brønshøj BK did (and do) sign contracts with some of their players, but they have never featured a full-time professional squad. So even today. This is meaningful as it shows an economical responsibility that has kept the club free from the bankruptcies, overstretching of budgets and mergings, that has been the fate of several other Danish teams over the years. At the same time though, the shown responsibility has made it increasingly hard to compete with the top-flight teams.

Recent years:

The team has been going up and down between the two lower tiers since 1990, although having had a string of seasons in the 2nd tier from 2010–11 to 2014–15 under the auspices of manager Bo Henriksen. This after winning the 3rd tier (2. division-East) in 2009/10.
Brønshøj Boldklub is currently participating in the 3rd tier after relegation in 2015. The team only narrowly escaped demotion from the national league system in 2018, with a win in the last match of the season against Greve Fodbold.

Most appearances
Brian Kaus, 350 appearances in all. (1985–90, 1996–2004)

Most goals
Kaj Petterson, 314 goals. (1938–54)

National team
11 players in all have represented Brønshøj BK on the Danish national team, almost all of them in the period from the late 1950s to the early 1970s. The last player to represent the club on the Danish national team was Kent Nielsen in 1986. In 2018 Brønshøj BK was represented by 2 players on the Gambian national team.

First representative on a national team: Ove Andersen in 1955.

Most caps: Per Røntved, 21 matches from 1970 to 1972. (He had 75 caps overall)

Current squad
As of 14 March 2023

Achievements
 14 seasons in the Highest Danish League
 32 seasons in the Second Highest Danish League
 20 seasons in the Third Highest Danish League
Brønshøj BK has made it to the semi-finals of the Landspokalturneringen (the equivalent of the English FA cup) four times. That was in the seasons of 1955/56, 1957/58, 1960/61 and 1987/88.

Supporters

The official fan club of Brønshøj BK is called Hvepsene (lit. "The Wasps"), and make up the majority of fans of the team, and arrange bus trips for away matches, family days with the team, and the like.

Brønshøj BK has only one known ultra group, Brønshøj Drunken Army, a nominally left-wing and anti-racist firm that supports the team standing up throughout the match with chants, songs and dance.

As of November 2011, Hvepsene and BDA made the largest tifo in the Danish 1st Division that year. Største tifo i 1. division

References

External links
 Brønshøj Boldklub – official site
 Brønshøj Boldklub – clubfacts at the Danish Football Association's database
 Doctor Brønshøj – Independent supporters' site with summary in English

Football clubs in Denmark
Association football clubs established in 1919
1919 establishments in Denmark
 
Football clubs in Copenhagen